

Storms
Note:  indicates the name was retired after that usage in the respective basin

Qendresa (2014) – also known as Medicane Qendresa; made landfall in Malta and Italy as a strong cyclone, causing three fatalities
Quang (2015) – intense cyclone that made landfall in the Northern Territory as a minimal cyclone, caused no deaths
Quedan
2001 – tropical storm that struck the Philippines
2005 – tropical depression that was recognized by PAGASA and JTWC
2009 – very intense typhoon that made landfall in Japan as a minimal typhoon, causing three deaths and $1.5 billion in damages
2013  – strongest typhoon to make landfall in mainland China since 1949; second-costliest typhoon to strike China
2017 – passed close to Japan as a severe tropical storm
Queenie
1945 – typhoon that struck the Philippines as a tropical storm
2006 – powerful typhoon that struck the Philippines
2014 – struck Vietnam
2018 – tied as the strongest cyclone worldwide in 2018, along with Typhoon Yutu; passed through South Korea as a tropical storm
2022 – remained out at sea.
Quenton
1983 - first cyclone to make landfall in Australia since 1973.
1994 - stayed out at sea throughout its life
Querida (1946) – typhoon that struck Taiwan, killing 154 and injuring 618
Quiel
2003 – only recognized by PAGASA
2011 – struck the Philippines
2019 – made landfall in Vietnam as a tropical storm
Quinta
2004 – made landfall in Japan as a Category 2 typhoon
2008 – renamed Siony; mostly stayed out at sea
2012 – tropical storm that brought flash floods to the Philippines
2020  – deadly tropical cyclone that devastated the Philippines.

See also

European windstorm names
Atlantic hurricane season
List of Pacific hurricane seasons
Tropical cyclone naming
South Atlantic tropical cyclone
Tropical cyclone

References
General

 
 
 
 
 
 
 
 
 
 
 
 
 
 
 
 
 

 
 
 
 
 

Q